Third-hand smoke is contamination by tobacco smoke that lingers following the extinguishing of a cigarette, cigar, or other combustible tobacco product. First-hand smoke refers to what is inhaled into the smoker's own lungs, while second-hand smoke is a mixture of exhaled smoke and other substances leaving the smoldering end of the cigarette that enters the atmosphere and can be inhaled by others. Third-hand smoke or "THS" is a neologism coined by a research team from the Dana–Farber/Harvard Cancer Center, where "third-hand" is a reference to the smoking residue on surfaces after "second-hand smoke" has cleared out.

Exposure and health effects 
Humans can be exposed to THS through inhalation, skin contact, or ingestion. Many common surfaces can accumulate THS compounds, including furnishings, walls and flooring, and clothes. THS is thought to potentially cause the greatest harm to infants and young children because younger children are more likely to put their hands in their mouths or be cuddled up to a smoker with toxins on their skin and clothes. Infants also crawl on the floor and eat from their hands without washing them first, ingesting the toxins into their still developing systems.

According to a study conducted by Northrup, 22% of infants and children are exposed to SHS/THS in their homes each year, comprising a major proportion of the 126 million nonsmokers exposed to harmful tobacco products annually.

Though research is limited, there are many harmful health effects that have been linked to THS exposure. THS has the potential to impair wound healing by altering the body’s natural anti-inflammatory response, remodel respiratory structure due to increased collagen deposits in airways, and cause permanent damage to DNA. Other health effects include asthma, increased cough morbidity, and other respiratory conditions. If pregnant mothers are exposed to THS, it can slow fetal lung development in the third trimester. In children, THS exposure has also been linked to sudden infant death syndrome (SIDS) as a potential cause factor, and has also been linked to cognitive and memory deficits in growing children.  Whether or not these largely theoretical relationships are actually causal in humans at realistic exposure levels remains to be seen.

Third-hand smoke has also been tested in various cell assays. THS exposure by cells have been shown to lead to the observation of DNA strand breaks, inhibition of proliferation, and cell death. Acrolein has shown to be a particularly potent third-hand smoke gas.

Chemical composition and reservoirs
Third-hand smoke and its components have been detected in a variety of indoor environments. The possibility of nitrosamine formation on vehicular surfaces was identified via the spraying of "high but reasonable" levels of nitrous acid (about 4–12 times the levels typically found in homes) onto cellulose substrates and wiping surfaces in a vehicle that had experienced heavy smoking. Similar results were found when cellulose substrates were kept (without wiping) in the same vehicle for three days when smoking occurred. Additionally, the persistence of various third-hand smoke components was quantified on wool, cotton, and polyester fibers with THS the most persistent on wool and least persistent on polyester. Washing clothing with detergent was found to remove some THS, though a substantial amount remained after standard laundering.

Because of the growing resolving power and improved detection limits of analytical instruments, studies have been able to demonstrate the transport of THS into other spaces via various media. For instance, third-hand smoke signatures have been detected in particles, which can effectively transport such compounds between indoor and outdoor air. Additionally, both gas-phase and aerosol-phase compounds linked to third-hand smoke were detected and quantified in a non-smoking movie theater, possibly via moviegoers' clothes and breath.

Environmental tobacco smoke can oxidize with environmental nitrous acid to create carcinogenic tobacco-specific nitrosamines (TSNAs). One TSNA, called 4-(methylnitrosamino)-1-(3-pyridinyl)-1-butanone (also known as nicotine-derived nitrosamine ketone, or NNK), is a potent lung-specific carcinogen ubiquitous in tobacco smoke and smokers' homes, and has been detected on clothing fibers, dust, and in the air. Nitrosamines, along with other tobacco smoke chemicals that deposited on surfaces or compounds that formed as a result of surface-phase reactions, can be a major source of toxicity, especially for infants. Infants can be particularly adversely affected given their frequent close proximity to household surfaces and their propensity to ingest third-hand smoke residue from surfaces and dust.

Biomarkers of disease
It is important to acknowledge the biomarkers of third-hand smoke because they indicate the severity and presence of disease. In a recent study involving mice, biomarkers of THS were discovered after four weeks of initial exposure at equivalent levels to those found in homes of smokers. Researchers used a system that mimicked that of the exposure to humans and sought out biomarkers found in serum, liver, and brain tissues in the mice. The mice were then exposed to THS at varying months and at as early as one month, they began to show signs of increased circulating inflammatory cytokines, tumor necrosis factor, granulocyte macrophage colony stimulating factor, and an increase in the stress hormone epinephrine. Damage from THS exposure continued after two, four, and six months. Such damages included oxidative stress and molecular damage. Some of the mice also became hyperglycemic and hyperinsulinimic, which could mean that insulin resistance could be a consequence of long-term exposure. This study implies that increased exposure time to THS can have dramatic effects. Additional studies with human subjects are still needed to fully understand the implications of THS.

Public awareness and solutions 
Third-hand smoke is a relatively newly postulated concept, and public awareness of it is lower than that of second-hand smoke. A 2013 study with six focus groups in metro and rural Georgia (USA) asked participants whether they had heard of THS, most of the participants had not heard about it and did not know what third-hand smoke was. Research on THS is growing, but does not compare to the 40 years of research on the effects of second-hand smoke. Yet, it is estimated that 5%-60% of second-hand smoke-related harm may actually be attributable to third-hand smoke exposure. THS poses such a risk because its exposure can linger much longer than second-hand smoke. Third-hand smoke-contaminated surfaces like carpet, walls, and car interiors are also especially hard to clean whereas second-hand smoke can be removed with ventilation.

Smoking rates in the United States have fallen considerably from a high of 42.4% in 1965 to around 17.8% in 2016. But the downward trend is slowing and it is estimated that 23% to 42% of adults in America with low education or living in poverty still smoke. This exposes millions of nonsmokers, many of which are children.

Awareness campaigns for THS are steadily growing in number and primarily focus on the health risks for young children. A 2014 study published in Pediatrics demonstrated that parents are more likely to attempt to quit smoking if they become convinced that third-hand smoke is harmful to children and are more likely to have smoke-free home and car policies if they are aware of the dangers of third-hand smoke. It was recommended for parents to safeguard their children by ensuring they have a smoke-free zone. One such way recommended for smokers to protect family, friends and others is by smoking outside and showering and changing clothes before coming into contact with others. However, research has shown that parents who are heavy smokers (> 10 cigarettes per day) are less likely to believe that third-hand smoke is harmful to children. Third-hand smoke is one of the issues promoting indoor smoking bans, especially supported by performers such as musicians, who are forced to bring third-hand smoke contamination into their homes through contaminated instruments and cases.

References 

Smoking
Neologisms
Health effects of tobacco

zh:二手煙#三手煙